T cell receptor gamma variable 1 (non-functional) is a protein that in humans is encoded by the TRGV1 gene.

References

Further reading 

Genes
Human proteins